Pinewood is a small unincorporated area in section 33 of Buzzle Township in Beltrami County, Minnesota, United States. Some local sources have estimated the population at 147, however that number cannot be confirmed. It is approximately 19 miles northwest of Bemidji, where most community services are available.

History
The town of Pinewood was established in 1879, and had a station of the Soo Line Railroad.  At its peak Pinewood also had a hotel, general store, mercantile store, sawmill, and livery stable.

Notes

Unincorporated communities in Minnesota
Unincorporated communities in Beltrami County, Minnesota